The 2022 European U23 Judo Championships was held in at the Arena Hotel Hills in Sarajevo, Bosnia and Herzegovina, from 28 to 30 October 2022. The final day of competition featured a mixed team event, won by team Turkey.

Schedule & event videos
The event aired on the EJU YouTube channel. The draw was held on 27 October at 16:00. All times are local (UTC+1).

Medal summary

Men's events

Women's events

Source Results

Mixed

Source:

Medal table

References

External links
 

European U23 Judo Championships
U23
European Championships, U23
Judo
Judo
European Judo U23 Championships